Osez Joséphine  (Dare Joséphine) is the eighth studio album by French rocker Alain Bashung, issued in 1991 on Barclay Records. Rolling Stone magazine considered it the greatest French album of all time.

Reception

Commercial performance 
The singles "Osez Joséphine", "Volutes" and "Madame rêve" ("Madame dreams") were successful, as was the album which peaked at 14th on the French charts. With this album, Bashung broke into the mainstream. The album sold 300,000 copies rather quickly for a French album at the time.

Critical reception 

In 2010, the French edition of Rolling Stone magazine gave this album the top spot of their list of the greatest French rock albums (out of 100). The album is included in the book La discothèque parfaite de l'odyssée du rock by Gilles Verlant, who calls Madame rêve, Osez Joséphine and Volutes "new classics from his repertoire" and the guitar riff by Sonny Landreth on Osez Joséphine "historical".

Legacy
In 2016, Australian psychedelic rock artist Nicholas Allbrook conceived his video for his single "A Fool There Was" (from his album Pure Gardiya) as a tribute to the video for the title track of Osez Joséphine.

Track listing

Personnel

Musicians 
 Alain Bashung - vocals, harmonica (5, 6, 9)
 Sonny Landreth - electric guitar (1, 4, 5, 7, 9), slide guitar (2, 5, 7, 9), acoustic guitar (2, 3, 4, 7), lapsteel & wind (3)
 Bernie Leadon - electric guitar (1, 5, 7), acoustic guitar (2, 4, 9), mandoline (7)
 Roland Vancampenhout - electric guitar (1, 5, 8), harmonica (5)
 Ron Levy - Hammond organ (1, 2, 3, 7, 9)
 Ken Blevins - drums (1, 2, 4, 7, 9), chimes (3)
 David Ranson - bass guitar (1, 2, 3, 4, 9), bass & strings (4)
 Philippe Decock - keyboards (3, 10), piano (8)

Production 
 Tom Harding: sound engineer (Memphis)
 Sophie Masson: sound engineer (Paris)
 Phil Delire: sound engineer (Bruxelles), mixing, realisation
 Éric Clermontet: realisation, executive production
 Alain Bashung: realisation
 Marc Antoine: realisation, executive production
 Jean-Baptiste Mondino: photos
 Huart / Cholley: graphism

Certifications

References 

1991 albums
Barclay (record label) albums
Alain Bashung albums